Research-intensive clusters (RICs) are regions with a high density of research-oriented organizations. These regions may be informally designated, or may be represented by a formal association. Member organizations are often universities, businesses, and non-profit research institutes.

Closely related concepts include research associations (in general), research parks, technology clusters, and economic clusters.  RICs differ from generic research associations in that the member organizations must be geographically close to one another.  RICs differ from research parks in that the member organizations are in separate locations within a geographical region, and are not sharing the same exact location.  RICs differ from technology and economic clusters because they focus on more research rather than on economic development per se, though for-profit businesses may certainly be members of both types of groups.

Other similar concepts include technology alliances and business parks. Technology alliances focus on economic development, often regardless of research-intensity or geographic density.  Business parks provide infrastructure and facilities to businesses, but there is no requirement for research-intensity and all the member organizations share facilities in exactly the same location.



List of research-intensive clusters

References

Further reading
 Phillip Raines.  "Developing Cluster Policies in Seven European Regions"  European Policies Research Center, University of Strathclyde; December 2000.
 Philip Cooke.  "Life Sciences Clusters and Regional Science Policy."  Urban Studies, Vol. 41, Nos 5/6, 1113–1131, May 2004.

Research
Economic geography